The Freeman String Symphonizer was a 5-octave synthesizer of the 1970s. (The first prototype being shown prior to 1970, but the most well known shown in 1970, the second according to the Sound on Sound article) It was finally manufactured by the Chicago Musical Instrument Co. and was also known as the Cordovox CSS. Its sound was related to that of the ARP String Ensemble – cool, glassy-sounding strings. Eventually, its inventor Ken Freeman tried to strike a deal with the company Ling but they abandoned their interest in it. Lowrey a division of CMI finally struck a deal after some deliberation.

The delay in getting the Freeman to market limited its sales. Some users were fairly famous, but its release was overshadowed by both the Eminent Solina and Crumar Stringman, both of which had only one oscillator and were cheaper to make.

The Freeman has 25 oscillators. One controls a digital 'top octave synthesizer' (TOS) IC (the common MK50240 in later versions; M087 or SAA1004 in earlier ones). The MK50240 TOS contains a set of 12 digital frequency dividers which derive a 'top octave' of notes from one 2MHz input signal. The tuning relationship is not perfect, but it can never vary. The other 24 oscillators are assigned two to each of the 12 notes. Thus there are 3 separate pitch references for each note. Each pitch is slightly different, thus creating an analog warmth as the tones of 2 out of 3 gradually drift a tiny amount to give a dynamic beat frequency between them, much like real instruments gradually change in pitch ever so slightly due to temperature changes.

Each top-octave note is fed to a simple digital counter IC, which divides by 2, 4, 8, 16, and so on, generating all the lower octaves of that note. So the Freeman has three complete sets of tones that can be mixed to create more or fewer overtones in the sound, as one rank is tuned an octave below the other from the beginning. The 'High' and 'Low' buttons on the front panel select which group is selected, or both can be mixed for a thicker octave overtone on each note. The 'Low' must be on to hear anything on the highest octave because there are not enough frequency divisions to layer the two across the whole 61-key keyboard.

Because all tones are present all the time, it had no restrictions on how many notes could be played at once, unlike most synthesizers at the time, which were often monophonic. (Aside from the duophonic ARP Odyssey for instance.)

The Ensemble effect invokes the TOS rank to add the additional thickness to the other two 'ranks' of oscillators. But the two that have one discrete oscillator per note have an 'animation amount' slider associated with them. 6 low-frequency oscillators are grouped to notes such that it maximizes the effect for typical chords. In other words, makes it always sound like there are as many different vibrato rates as possible to again simulate an actual symphony. A built-in spring reverb helps simulate a hall environment. And again one could choose 'cello' (16'), and 'violin' (8') tones.

There was a 'touch' (delayed) vibrato setting, and a 'glide' switch on the foot volume pedal (found also on many Lowery home organs), which dropped the pitch one-half step. This made it unique compared to other string machines that had only one oscillator and relied on delay line chips to produce the ensemble effect (chips that have to reduce the audio bandwidth to mask the digital clocking).

It was a heavy machine - about 70 lbs - and was rather durable except for the removable keyboard cover which looked like it hinged up, but rather pulled straight out.

It was used by The Who, Jan Hammer, Chick Corea, Elton John, Ramsey Lewis, Peter Sinfield, Peter Bardens of Camel and John Philip Shenale on "Reindeer King" from Native Invader by Tori Amos. 

Recently, it has been emulated in software by GForce, with their Virtual String Machine software.

References

Ken Freeman & The Birth Of String Synthesis, Sound On Sound, February 2007

String synthesizers